Seneca (officially Merchants Insurance @ Seneca since June 27, 2019 for sponsorship purposes) is a Buffalo Metro Rail station located in the 200 block of Main Street between Seneca and Swan Streets in the Free Fare Zone, which allows passengers free travel between Erie Canal Harbor and Fountain Plaza station. Passengers continuing northbound past Fountain Plaza are required to provide proof-of-payment. On June 27, 2019, The Buffalo News announced that Merchants Insurance, which has been located at 260 Main Street since the 1960s, bought the naming rights for $161,000 for initially five years, with the option to renew for another five years.

Bus routes
 At Seneca and Main Streets:
 66 Williamsville
 67 Cleveland Hill
 69 Alden (outbound)
 79 Tonawanda (inbound)
 81 Eastside (inbound)
 204 Downtown/Airport Express (inbound)
 At Seneca and Pearl Streets:
 8 Main (inbound)
 64 Lockport (outbound)
 70 East Aurora (inbound)
 72 Orchard Park (inbound)
 74 Hamburg (outbound)
 75 West Seneca (outbound)
 76 Lotus Bay (outbound)
 At Seneca and Washington Streets (heading north, east or south):
 6 Sycamore
 8 Main (outbound)
 14 Abbott
 16 South Park
 24 Genesee
 42 Lackawanna
 61 North Tonawanda (outbound)
 68 George Urban (outbound)
 70 East Aurora (outbound)
 72 Orchard Park (outbound)
 79 Tonawanda (outbound)

Notable places nearby
Seneca station is located near:
 Buffalo–Exchange Street station (Amtrak train station)
 Burt Flickinger Center
 Erie Community College, city campus (also Old Post Office)
 Sahlen Field (formerly Coca-Cola Field, Dunn Tire Park, North AmeriCare Park, Downtown Ballpark and Pilot Field)
 Seneca One Tower (formerly One HSBC Center)

See also
 List of Buffalo Metro Rail stations

References

Buffalo Metro Rail stations
Railway stations in the United States opened in 1984